is a Japanese light novel series written by Yū Shimizu and illustrated by Asagi Tōsaka. Media Factory have published eleven volumes since May 2019 under their MF Bunko J imprint. The light novel is licensed in North America by Yen Press. A manga adaptation with art by Asuka Keigen has been serialized in Kadokawa Shoten's shōnen manga magazine Monthly Shōnen Ace since November 2019. It has been collected in five tankōbon volumes. An anime television series adaptation produced by Passione has been announced.

Plot
A thousand years ago, the world was at war. Led by the Six Dark Lords, humanity as a whole was nearly led to the brink of extinction. However, humanity had hope in the form of the Six Heroes. With their power, the Six Dark Lords fell one by one until finally, only one remained. In the year 447 of the Holy Calendar, the Undead King, Leonis Death Magnus, also fell but before his capital, Necrozoa, was conquered, he sealed his own body with a powerful barrier and cast a resurrection spell on himself. He declared that he will concede victory only this once but he shall rise again in one thousand years to conquer humanity for that is the mission given to him by the Goddess of Rebellion.

In the present time, a young girl named Riselia Ray Crystalia stumbled upon the ancient ruins of Leonis's mausoleum. Accidentally undoing the seal, Leonis awakens after his thousand-year slumber in the body of a ten-year-old human child. Mistaken to be a refugee of the Voids, Riselia takes Leonis into her care and Leonis begins his mission to uncover what has happened to the world while he slept.

Characters

Main Characters

 The Undead King and Strongest of the Dark Lords, Leonis awakens in the body of a ten-year-old child one thousand years in the future. With the help of Riselia (whom he and Regina affectionally call "Selia"), Leonis begins adjusting to his new life but Leonis also has plans of his own, including fulfilling the wish of his benefactor, the Goddess of Rebellion.

 Riselia is the girl who unwittingly undid the seal on Leonis's mausoleum and nearly died protecting him from a Void; left with no choice, Leonis "heals" Riselia with the only spell he is certain would work, the tenth-order spell "Create Elder Undead", a spell that worked so successfully on Riselia that she returned to life as the strongest undead being, a Vampire Queen.

Seventh Assault Garden

 Riselia's childhood friend and personal maid, Regina is a buxom girl who spends most of her free time trying to elicit a reaction from Leonis who deeply dislikes it (especially considering that this is the first time since forever that Leonis had a human body). She is in actuality the (former) Fourth Princess of the Integrated Empire, Regina Ray O'ltriese, however, due to being born under a superstitious star, she was removed from the family and replaced by her younger sister, Altiria Ray O'ltriese.

Sword Warrior. Even though she was the youngest in the platoon after Leonis, she had a track record of conquering the void alone.

 A caring senior who serves as telegraphist for the platoon to which Riselia belongs. She has a history of losing her companions due to Void. She uses a support-specialized holy sword (Heavenly Eye Jewel), but was originally an attacker in charge of firepower.

Six Heroes

 The Archsage of the Six Heroes and considered to be the wisest of them all, he had survived through the one thousand years since Leonis's "death" and fights him once again as a Void Lord. He is defeated and erased from existence by the Demon Sword Dáinsleif but not before giving Leonis an eerie warning.

Other Characters

Media

Light novels
The Demon Sword Master of Excalibur Academy is written by Yū Shimizu and illustrated by Asagi Tōsaka. It began publication by Media Factory on May 25, 2019 under their MF Bunko J imprint. Eleven volumes have been released as of November 2022. The light novel is licensed in North America by Yen Press.

Manga
A manga adaptation with art by Asuka Keigen began serialization in Kadokawa Shoten's Monthly Shōnen Ace magazine on November 26, 2019. Five tankōbon volumes have been released as of June 2022. At Sakura-Con 2022, Yen Press announced that they would also publish the manga in English.

Anime
An anime television series adaptation was announced on October 21, 2021. It will be produced by Passione.

See also
 Bladedance of Elementalers, another light novel series by the same author.
 Heat the Pig Liver, another light novel series illustrated by the same illustrator.

References

External links
 
 
 

2019 Japanese novels
Anime and manga based on light novels
Kadokawa Dwango franchises
Kadokawa Shoten manga
Light novels
MF Bunko J
Passione (company)
Shōnen manga
Upcoming anime television series
Yen Press titles